Ascent rate is how fast one rises; it may apply to:
 diving decompression;
 meteorological balloons.

See also
Rate of climb
Lapse rate

Temporal rates